Söderhamn Airport , also known as Helsinge Airport, is a former airport in Söderhamn, Sweden. Use of the airport is still possible with prior permission required (PPR).

See also
 List of the largest airports in the Nordic countries

References

Airports in Sweden